Ács (or simply Acs, without diacritics) is a Hungarian-language occupational surname  literally meaning "carpenter". Notable people with this surname include:

Gabor Acs (born 1926), Hungarian-born American architect
Ilona Ács (1920–1976), Hungarian swimmer and Olympics competitor
István Ács (1928–2018), Hungarian jurist and politician
Johanna Acs (born 1992), German model and beauty pageant winner
József Ács (disambiguation), several people
Oszkár Ács (born 1969), Hungarian bass guitarist
Péter Ács (born 1981), Hungarian chess grandmaster
Zoltan Acs (born 1947), Austrian-born Hungarian and American economist

Hungarian-language surnames
Occupational surnames

hu:Ács (családnév)